Marcel Beyer (born 23 November 1965) is a German writer.

Life
Marcel Beyer was born in Tailfingen, Württemberg, and grew up in Kiel and Neuss. From 1987 to 1991 he studied German language and literature, English studies and literary studies at the University of Siegen; in 1992 he obtained a Magister degree with a work on Friederike Mayröcker. Since 1987, he has developed performance art. From 1989 he published, with Karl Riha, the series Vergessene Autoren der Moderne (Forgotten Modernist Authors) at the University of Siegen.

From 1990 to 1993, he worked as editor on the literary magazine Konzepte; from 1992 to 1998, he was a contributor to the music magazine  Spex. In 1996 and 1998, he was writer in residence at University College London and the University of Warwick in Coventry. Beyer lived until 1996 in Cologne, and since then in Dresden. He is a visiting professor at the European Graduate School in Saas-Fee.

From early on Beyer, strongly influenced by Friederike Mayröcker and the authors of the French nouveau roman, was a writer of lyric poetry and novels, always taking an idiosyncratic view of German history, in particular the Third Reich era.

Honours

1991 Rolf Dieter Brinkmann scholarship 
1991 Ernst Willner Prize at the Ingeborg Bachmann competition in Klagenfurt 
1992 North Rhine Westphalia promotional prize
1996 Berlin Literature Prize 
1996  
1996 German Critics Federation prize 
1997 Uwe Johnson Prize
1998 Förderpreis Horst Bienek Prize for Poetry
1999 Lessing Prize of the Free State of Saxony
2000 Jean-Paul-Literaturförderpreis of the City of Bayreuth
2001 Heinrich-Böll-Preis 
2003 Friedrich Hölderlin Prize of the city of Tübingen 
2004  
2006 Erich Fried Prize
2008 Joseph-Breitbach-Preis
2008 Deutscher Buchpreis (Longlist) for Kaltenburg
2008 
2010 Scholarship at Villa Massimo
2012/2013 Stadtschreiber von Bergen
2013 Ernst Jandl Lectureship of Poetry at the University of Vienna
2014 Kleist Prize
2016 Georg Büchner Prize
2021 Peter-Huchel-Preis

Works
Walkmännin, Neu-Isenburg 1990 
Das Menschenfleisch, Frankfurt/Main 1991
Friederike Mayröcker, Frankfurt/Main 1992 
Brauwolke. Berlin 1994 (together with Klaus Zylla) 
Flughunde. Frankfurt/Main 1995 (translated as The Karnau Tapes by John Brownjohn, 1997 and graphic novel adaptation by Ulli Lust, 2013)
HNO-Theater im Unterhemd. Berlin 1995
Falsches Futter. Frankfurt/Main 1997 
Spione. Cologne 2000 (translated as Spies by Breon Mitchell, 2005)
Zur See. Berlin 2001 
Erdkunde. Cologne 2002 
Nonfiction. To Cologne 2003 
Vergeßt mich. Cologne 2006
Kaltenburg. Suhrkamp 2008 (translated as Kaltenburg by Alan Bance, 2012)
Arbeit Nahrung Wohnung. Bühnenmusik für vierzehn Herren. Opernlibretto (composition by Enno Poppe)
IQ. Testbatterie in 8 Akten. Opernlibretto (composition by Enno Poppe). UA: 27. April 2012, Schwetzinger SWR Festspiele
Putins Briefkasten. Erzählungen. Suhrkamp, Frankfurt am Main 2012, 
Graphit. Gedichte. Suhrkamp, Frankfurt am Main 2014, 
XX. Lichtenberg-Poetikvorlesungen (Göttinger Sudelblätter). Wallstein, Göttingen 2015, 
Im Situation Room: der entscheidende Augenblick. Rede an die Abiturienten des Jahrgangs 2015. Conte, Sankt Ingbert 2014,

Essays
"Das wilde Tier im Kopf des Historikers", in: Lose Blätter No. 27, 2004 
"Die Katze von Vilnius", in BELLA triste No. 15, 2006 
"Aurora", Münchener Reden zur Poesie. From the series Lyrik Kabinett Munich, 2006

Publications as editor 
Rudolf Blümner: Der Stuhl, die Ohrfeige und anderes literarisches Kasperletheater Siegen 1988  number 35 
Ernst Jandl: Gemeinschaftsarbeit. Siegen 1989 (written together with Friederike Mayröcker and Andreas Okopenko) 
Rudolf Blümner: Ango laina und andere Texte. Munich 1993 (together with Karl Riha) 
George Grosz: Grosz Berlin. Hamburg 1993 (together with Karl Riha) 
William S. Burroughs. Eggingen 1995 (together with Andreas Kramer) 
Ausreichend lichte Erklärung. Munich 1998 (together with Christoph Buchwald) 
Friederike Mayröcker: Collected prose. Frankfurt/Main (together with Klaus and Klaus Kastberger) 2001 
Friederike Mayröcker: Collected poems. Frankfurt/Main 2004

Translations
Michael Hofmann: Feineinstellungen. Cologne 2001 
Gertrude Stein: Spinnwebzeit, bee time vine und andere Gedichte. Zurich 1993

Anthologies
Junge Lyrik, Neuss 1983 (Neue Neusser Series)

References

External links

Marcel Beyer at European Graduate School. Biography, bibliography and articles
Marcel Beyer at Germany-Poetry International Web
Marcel Beyer at Goethe-Institut, Australia
Marcel Beyer in: NRW Literatur im Netz 

1965 births
Living people
Academic staff of European Graduate School
University of Siegen alumni
Members of the Academy of Arts, Berlin
German-language poets
German male poets
Georg Büchner Prize winners